Mateusz Jeleń (born 18 September 1988 in Kraków) is a Polish midfielder who plays for Polish Orange Ekstraklasa side Cracovia.

References

1988 births
Living people
MKS Cracovia (football) players
Polish footballers
Ayia Napa FC players
Expatriate footballers in Cyprus
Footballers from Kraków
Cypriot Second Division players
Association football midfielders